The 1990 Chico State Wildcats football team represented California State University, Chico as a member of the Northern California Athletic Conference (NCAC) during the 1990 NCAA Division II football season. Led by second-year head coach Gary Hauser, Chico State compiled an overall record of 4–6 with a mark of 3–2 in conference play, placing third in the NCAC. The team outscored its opponents 287 to 246 for the season. The Wildcats played home games at University Stadium in Chico, California.

Schedule

References

Chico State
Chico State Wildcats football seasons
Chico State Wildcats football